The European Educational Research Association (EERA) is association of national and regional associations representing educational researchers in Europe. EERA aims to encourage collaboration amongst educational researchers in Europe, promote communication between educational researchers and international governmental organisations and disseminate and highlight state-of-the-art findings of educational research, primarily through the annual European Conference on Educational Research (ECER) and its associated journal, the European Educational Research Journal (EERJ), the EERA Blog and the EERA Book Series - Transdisciplinary Perspectives in Educational Research.

History
EERA was founded in June 1994 as a result of discussions among many national educational research associations and several major research institutes throughout Europe which identified the need for a European association to foster the exchange of ideas amongst European researchers, promote collaboration in research, improve research quality and offer independent advice on educational research and policies to European and national policy-makers, administrators and practitioners.  From 1994 to 2007, EERA was constituted as a Charity under British Law and based in Glasgow, Scotland. Since 2008, EERA has been operating from its new office in Berlin, Germany, and is constituted as a non-profit organisation under German Law.

Objectives
EERA aims to promote collaboration among educational researchers and their respective associations in Europe. It promotes communication between educational researchers and international governmental organisations, such as the EU, Council of Europe, OECD, and UNESCO. Furthermore, EERA seeks to disseminate the findings of educational research and to ensure that the contribution of educational research to policy and practice is recognized and desired.

Membership
EERA is constituted as an association of associations (i.e. there are no individual members). Its membership is made up of more than 30 national and regional Educational Research Associations from all parts of wider Europe.

EERA member associations
 Albania - CDE Center for Democratic Education
 Armenia – Educational Research Armenian Centre 
 Austria – Österreichische Gesellschaft für Forschung und Entwicklung im Bildungswesen 
 Belarus – Belarus National Association "Innovations in Education" (IE) 
 Belgium – Association Belge des Chercheurs en Education and Vlaams Forum voor Onderwijsonderzoek 
 Cyprus – Cyprus Pedagogical Association, and Cyprus Educational Sciences Association 
 Czech Republic – Česká asociace pedagogického výzkumu 
 Denmark – Nordic Educational Research Association
 Estonia – Eesti Akadeemiline Pedagoogika Selts 
 Finland – Finnish Educational Research Association  and Nordic Educational Research Association 
 France – Association des Enseignants et Chercheurs en Sciences de l'Education 
 Germany – Deutsche Gesellschaft für Erziehungswissenschaft 
 Greece – Hellenic Educational Society 
 Hungary – Hungarian Educational Research Association 
 Iceland – Nordic Educational Research Association 
 Ireland – Educational Studies Association of Ireland 
 Italy – Società Italiana di Pedagogia 
 Lithuania – Lithuanian Educational Research Association 
 Luxembourg - University of Luxembourg
 Malta - Malta Educational Research Association
 Netherlands – Vereniging voor Onderwijs Research 
 Norway – Nordic Educational Research Association 
 Poland – Polskie Towarzystwo Pedagogiczne 
 Portugal – Centro de Investigação, Difusão e Intervenção Educacional and Sociedade Portuguesa de Ciências da Educação 
 Romania - University of Bucharest
 Russia - RERA, Educational Research Association Russia 
 Serbia - DIOS Društvo istraživača u obrazovanju u Srbiji (Educational Research Association of Serbia-ERAS)
 Slovakia – Slovenskápedagogická spoločnosť 
 Slovenia – Slovensko društvoraziskovalcev na področju edukacije 
 Spain – Asociación Interuniversitaria de Investigación Pedagógica and Sociedad Española de Pedagogía 
 Sweden – Nordic Educational Research Association 
 Switzerland – Schweizerische Gesellschaft für Bildungsforschung
 Turkey – Eğitim Araştırmaları Birliği  and Eğitim Yöneticileri ve Eğitim Deneticileri Derneği 
 United Kingdom  – British Educational Research Association (British Educational Research Association) and Scottish Educational Research Association 
 Ukraine - UERA Ukrainian Educational Researchers Association

Organisation
EERA is governed by Council and the Executive Board].

The executive board is made up of the President, the Treasurer and the Secretary General who are elected for a four-year term:

2022 Executive: 
 Joe O'Hara, EERA President
 Maria P. Figueiredo, EERA Secretary General
 Andreas Hadjar, EERA Treasurer
 Petra Grell, Networks Representative on EERA Council

Council consists of the representatives of the member associations and the co-opted Council members – the Networks’ Representative on Council, the editor of EERJ and the Convener of the Emerging Researchers' Group.

Networks
The academic work of EERA and especially the ECER conference is organised in networks. They are either discipline oriented or focus on certain research themes within educational research.

 1. Professional Learning and Development 
 2. Vocational Education and Training
 3. Curriculum 
 4. Inclusive Education
 5. Children and Youth at Risk and Urban Education
 6. Open Learning: Media, Environments and Cultures
 7. Social Justice and Intercultural Education
 8. Research on Health Education
 9. Assessment, Evaluation, Testing and Measurement
 10. Teacher Education Research
 11. Educational Effectiveness and Quality Assurance
 12. LISnet - Library and Information Science Network
 13. Philosophy of Education 
 14. Communities, families, and schooling in educational research
 15. Research on Partnerships in Education
 16. ICT in Education and Training
 17. Histories of Education
 18. Research in Sport Pedagogy
 19. Ethnography
 20. Research in Innovative Intercultural Learning Environments
 21 Education and Psychoanalysis 
 22. Research in Higher Education
 23. Policy Studies and Politics of Education
 24. Mathematics Education Research
 25. Research on Children's Rights in Education
 26. Educational Leadership
 27. Didactics - Learning and Teaching
 28. Sociologies of Education
 29. Research on Arts Education
 30. Research on Environmental and Sustainability Education
 31. Led – Network on Language and Education
 32. Organizational Education
 33 Gender and Education 
 Emerging Researchers’ Group (former Postgraduate Network)

Emerging Researchers’ Group
EERA actively promotes the work and professional development of early researchers and PhD students and has therefore established the Emerging Researchers´ Group (ERG).

The Emerging Researchers' Group seeks to:·
 provide a European research community for Emerging Researchers (including those undertaking a Doctorate) ·
 provide a forum for dissemination of Early Career Research at the Emerging Researchers’ Conference.·
 offer support and guidance for article and poster production via the 'Best Paper Award' and 'Best Poster Award'·
 offer support for researchers from Central and Eastern Europe and other low-GDP countries to attend ECER and engage with peers through the bursary program·
 train researchers by offering Season Schools, such as the Summer School on Educational Methodology. 
 Moreover, the ERG supports EERA networks in conducting season schools.

Best Paper Award

European Conference on Educational Research (ECER)
EERA's most visible contribution to the dissemination of educational research is the annual European Conference on Educational Research (ECER).

The first ECER took place in Twente, Netherlands in 1992. Numbers of attendants have grown steadily since then. Usually ECER attracts over 2500 researchers from about 70 different countries.

Other activities
EERA supports advanced research and training for young researchers and established scholars by funding season schools, projects, seminars, workshops and roundtables of its networks. Since 2009 EERA has run a series of summer schools for emerging researchers.

European Educational Research Journal (EERJ)
The European Educational Research Journal (EERJ) is the official journal of the European Educational Research Association (EERA). It is an international peer-reviewed journal with an editorial board drawn from across Europe and representing leading scholars in the educational field.  The EERJ Editor is a member of the EERA Council.

Book Series - Transdisciplinary Perspectives in Educational Research 
EERA, in partnership with Springer, publishes a book series focusing on presenting educational research in an innovative, transdisciplinary format. Drawing on extensively on the work of the 33 EERA Networks, the book series seeks to explore issues of importance in educational research in a manner that highlights the potential contribution of distinctive European research approach to the development of the field. The first five titles have been published as of 2022 and cover the following areas: 

 Partnerships in Education
 Wellbeing and Schooling
 Children’s Rights from International Educational Perspectives
 Gender and Education in Politics, Policy and Practice
 Storied Doctorates

Further details can be found at publishers website

EERA Blog 
In 2020 EERA launched the ' EERA Blog' a forum dedicated to disseminating educational research in a more accessible yet still academically rigorous manner. Submissions are invited from across Europe and beyond.

Partnerships 
EERA is an active member of a number of international research networks including the WERA ( World Educational Research Association), ISE ( Initiative for Science in Europe) and EASSH ( European Alliance for Social Sciences and Humanities)

References

Educational organizations based in Europe